Fan rice, usually stacks of rice bags decorated with ribbons and photos, are gifts from K-pop fans to their favorite artists. The amount of donated rice can vary between a few kilograms and several tonnes. The rice is usually then donated to a charity of the idols' choice.

History 
The first instance of fan-donated rice was at Shin Hye-sung's concert on 11 August 2007.  In previous years, it was common for fan clubs to create displays of flowers and decorative banners for their favorite idols. The trend started in the late 2000s when fans began to send food to their favorite music artists, and took off in 2011. Today, there are entire businesses dedicated to the donation of fan rice in South Korea.

Characteristics
Fans of K-pop buy bags of rice and donate them to their favorite artists. Rice is sorted out in 20 kg bags, arranged into "towers" by dedicated companies who purchase the rice from local farmers and transport it to the venues according to the orders from the fan clubs. Fans often inscribe special or personal messages onto the bags or attach photos to them. Donating rice indicates that fans take greater social responsibility besides showing their respect and support to their favorite artists. Sending rice bags to venues have also appeared in Japan, as part of the K-pop wave.

Philanthropy among K-pop fans serves to promote the public images of both the idols they support and the fans themselves. Fan's awareness of their somewhat negative reputation has motivated them to take action to leave a more positive, "mature" impression.

There exists, however, an element of competition between both different fan clubs and among members belonging to the same club. There have been cases of fans within the same club vying to make sure that their favorite group member receives the most gifts or donations, which can cause stress for other fans.

Notable donations 
 In 2013, the record of fan rice donated for a celebrity event was held by the fan club of 2PM, where fans from different countries donated 28 tonnes of rice for their <What Time Is It> finale concert.
 For Rain's concert, The Best Show Tour, his Korean fan club, Cloud Korea, collectively donated 3.6 tons of rice to the hungry.
 Fans of TVXQ!'s U-Know Yunho donated 36 tons of rice to celebrate his appearance in the web drama "I Order You" in 2015, 9.5 tons of which was donated to low-income elderly and children in his home city of Gwangju, South Korea.
 Big Bang fans collectively donated around 168 tons of rice among other goods to Dreame Korea in December 2017 in honor of the group's last concert before going on hiatus.
 After BtoB's visit to Cambodia in 2013, fans of the group donated rice in Cambodia and some even traveled there to distribute their donations in person.

References

K-pop